Diane Barbeau (March 23, 1961 – November 6, 2021) was a Quebec politician. She represented Vanier in the National Assembly of Quebec from 1994 to 2003, as a member of the Parti Québécois (PQ).

Barbeau worked as an aide for François Beaulne, the PQ member for Bertrand.

She ran for the Parti Québécois in the open seat of Vanier in the 1994, she easily won the seat by almost double her opponent and was re-elected in the 1998 election.

Barbeau served in the government of Lucien Bouchard as a Deputy Whip and as a Parliamentary Secretary to the Minister of Social Solidarity from January 27, 1999 to March 8, 2001 when Bernard Landry took over as Premier. She served in his government as Parliamentary Secretary to the Minister of Employment and Social Solidarity, from 2001 until 2002, and then for the Minister of State for Human Resources until the end of the government.

She abruptly ended her political career in 2003, a month before that year's elections were called, after she was diagnosed with kidney cancer while pregnant, forcing an early birth a month later and eventually leading to the loss of both kidneys.

References 

1961 births
Living people
French Quebecers
Parti Québécois MNAs
Women MNAs in Quebec
20th-century Canadian legislators
20th-century Canadian women politicians
21st-century Canadian legislators
21st-century Canadian women politicians
People from Baie-Comeau